Our Lady of the Most Holy Rosary, Queen of the Caracol, known locally as Mahal na Birhen ng Santo Rosaryo, Reyna ng Karakol or Nuestra Señora Virgen del Santissimo Rosario, Reina de Caracol, is the patroness of the Municipality of Rosario, formerly known as Salinas, in Cavite province, Philippines.

Description

The icon is a painting of the Blessed Virgin Mary depicted as Our Lady of the Most Holy Rosary. The Virgin, in blue and red clothes, seems to be sitting on clouds above an image that appears to be purgatory. In her left arm, she carries the Infant Jesus and in her right hand, the cross of a 15 decade Rosary. The Infant Jesus is garbed in a light blue attire. In his right hand he holds a globe with a cross on top symbolizing his role as protector of the earth. In his right left hand he holds one end of the Rosary.

The icon of the Our Lady of the Most Holy Rosary, Queen of the Caracol is painted on canvas and framed in wood with silver adornments of grapes and vines. The painting is set with gold accouterments. The most venerated icon is enthroned at the altar of the Parish of The Most Holy Rosary, also known as the Rosario Church, in the town of Rosario.

History

Rosario is a coastal town in the province of Cavite along the shores of Manila Bay. It was formerly a barrio or (barangay) of the town of San Francisco de Malabon (now General Trias). It was then called Salinas-Marsella for its salt evaporation industry.  Marsella, on the other hand, comes from the Spanish word ‘’mar’’ (sea). It was named so because of its proximity to the sea. However, before the twilight of the Spanish era its name was changed to Rosario in honor of the ‘’Virgen del Rosario de Caracol’’ which was the patroness of the place. How this virgin came to the town, nobody can tell the exact details. A plausible story was told by one of the most respected couple of Rosario – Don Catalino Abueg and Dona Rosa Ner - as to how the virgin came to the town.

During the Spanish colonial period, one of the best means of transportation was by boat. Cargoes from the south were brought to Manila by big boats, and there were many batel (fishing boats) in Manila bay. Many years ago, in a date which remained unremembered, a strong typhoon visited Manila and the area. It caused great destruction of life and properties especially to those who lived along the coastal areas of Manila bay. Countless fishermen as well as merchants were caught by the turbulent wind in the midst of the sea. One of these boats coming from Mindoro was loaded with merchandise. The furious wind and the terrifying lashes of rain hit the boat, with the waves in their wildest moments.  Water started to fill the boat to the point that it was almost sinking. The crewmen of the boat, filled with terror as death approaches, tied themselves to the boat so they would not be thrown overboard. The head of the crew went inside the cabin to check whatever goods he could save. As he moved around, he noticed the framed image of the Lady of the Most Holy Rosary hanging on a post. A strong wind rocked the boat that made the frame swing to the point of almost being dropped in the water. The sight of the image gave him a little light of hope for safety. He beg the virgin to spare his life and that of his companions with the promise that they would build a chapel in her honor as soon as they landed on the shore. The Virgin must have heard his prayers for they were all saved.

The stormy night was followed by a serene and sunny morning. They found themselves along the shore of Mojon now called Muzon, a sitio of the barrio of Salinas-Marsella. With great joy and gratitude, they built a chapel on a ground which was said to belong to a certain Lieutenant Felix Suasa. The makeshift chapel was made of bamboo and the lumber used for the altar of the Virgin was from their very own boat.  There was a great feasting for the affair. The image was entrusted by the crewmen to the people of the Mojon. The crew of the boat left leaving a legacy, which became an undying tradition - the town fiesta in honor of the Virgin of the Most Holy Rosary. After sometime, the people felt that they should give a more beautiful and bigger home for the Virgin. Hence, from Muzon the shrine was transferred to the present site of the parish church and a more decent chapel was built.

Historically, there is no exact data or record as to when she became the patroness of Rosario. On April 21, 1984, Tony Nazareno, the president of the Antique Dealers Association of the Philippines came to examine the painting of the Virgin Mary. According to him, the image is a product of a Filipino brush. The face of Our Lady of the Most Holy Rosary is very Filipina, a rare piece in the Philippine iconography. He believed that the style of the painting belonged to a well-known painter, Faustino Quiotang, and suggested that the icon was painted sometime between 1810 and 1820.

The parish and the town of Rosario was established on October 22, 1845 as promulgated by Governor-General Narciso Claveria.

Devotion

The town fiesta of Rosario or the feast of Our Lady of the Most Holy Rosary is celebrated twice a year, the first is in the month of May held during the third Sunday of the month. In some instances, it is moved to the fourth Sunday when it is close in proximity to the fiesta of Saint Isidore the Laborer.  The second is on October 7 to celebrate the feast of Our Lady of the Most Holy Rosary.

The festivities include the ritual dance-procession called "caracol" (also spelled "karakol", meaning "prayer through dancing" or "pasayaw na pananalangin"), also danced in other festivals within the province of Cavite and thus serves as the local equivalent of Manila's Buling-Buling of the district of Pandacan. During the eve of the fiesta, the Virgin is placed on a float or andas during the dance-procession, which is then carried on the shoulders by her devotees (mostly male).  The two-tiered float is heavily decorated with curtains and flowers.  From the church, majority of those who participate in the Caracol procession also dances to the lively tune of "Pandanggo" or any Philippine folk music provided by the town's brass marching bands, hired to provide musical accompaniment to the procession or via sound trucks blasting recorded music. The float of the Virgin Mary is also swayed to the music while it is being paraded around town. Together with the dancing, the procession is a slow snail-like pace (the origin of the word "caracol", the Spanish word for snail).  The image of the Virgin Mary is brought towards the shore of Manila Bay for a fluvial procession.

Once the dance-procession reaches the seashore, the image of the Virgin is then boarded on a big fishing boat.  While at the sea, hundreds of smaller fishing boats go around the Marian boat as veneration to the Virgin. Music is provided by the brass band also loaded on their boats.  Adding color to the fluvial parade, participating boats displays different colorful banners during the fluvial parade.  From Barangay Wawa,  The image is brought to Barangay Muzon where it lands.  From Muzon, the Virgin is once again brought back to the church with the "Karakol sa lupa" or "land Caracol".

This Caracol caught the attention of the committee on the Marian procession in Intramuros. In December 1982, the Virgin and the people of Rosario were invited to participate in the annual Grand Marian Procession in Intramuros. People applauded as the Virgin and her devotees danced to the joyful tune of the “Pandanggo”. Even the Apostolic Nuncio to the Philippines that time, the Most Reverend Bruno Torpigiliani, D.D. was deeply touched by the scene. Hence, he commented that this was the first time he witnessed such a deep and strong filial devotion to the Blessed Mother.

Organizations
The Confradia de la Nuestra Senora del Santissimo Rosario, Reina de Caracol (Confraternity of Our Lady of the Most Holy Rosary, Queen of Caracol or the Kapisanan ng Mahal na Birhen ng Santo Rosario) is a church organization dedicated to the patroness.

References

Catholic Church in the Philippines
Religion in Cavite